Meng-po is the easternmost of the "Brass Knuckles", a series of equatorial dark regions on Pluto. Meng-po straddles the zero meridian, directly under Pluto's tidally locked moon Charon and just west of the tail of the "Whale", Cthulhu Macula. It is named after Meng Po , the Chinese underworld deity of forgetfulness.

References

Regions of Pluto